The 2009 NBA Development League expansion draft was the fourth expansion draft of the National Basketball Association Development League (NBADL). The draft was held on September 2, 2009, so that the newly founded Springfield Armor and Maine Red Claws could acquire players for the upcoming 2009–10 season. The Armor was created when the Anaheim Arsenal relocated from the West Coast to the East Coast in an effort for the league to establish a greater presence in the east. Springfield was able to retain the rights to many of Anaheim's players, but with the addition of the Maine Red Claws, a need for an expansion draft arose. The Colorado 14ers were also putting the 2009–10 season on hiatus before their eventual move to Frisco, Texas to become the Texas Legends, which evened out the number of teams in the NBADL at 16.

A random drawing determined who was awarded the first pick, which went to the Springfield Armor. The draft took place via teleconference from the NBADL headquarters in New York City. The first overall selection was Marcus Campbell who had played collegiately at Mississippi State. Maine's first choice, the second overall pick, was James White, who had spent most of his collegiate career at Cincinnati. White was also among four players chosen who had also been selected previously in an NBA Draft, while he was one of six who had been honored as an NBA D-League All-Star before. The only non-American player selected in the 2009 NBA Development League Expansion Draft was Malick Badiane of Senegal. He had not played at the college level in the United States; rather, he had spent his post-high school years playing professionally in different countries before embarking on his D-League career.

Key

Draft

References
General

Specific

draft
NBA G League expansion draft
Maine Red Claws
Springfield Armor